Pushkinskaya is a station of the Saint Petersburg Metro. It first opened on 30 April 1956, under the original name of "Vitebskiy vokzal", referring to the connecting Vitebsky railway station.

There is a monument in the station dedicated to the poet Alexander Pushkin sculpted by Mikhail Anikushin. This station was the first USSR metro station with memorial located under the ground.

Saint Petersburg Metro stations
Railway stations in Russia opened in 1956
Railway stations located underground in Russia
Cultural heritage monuments of regional significance in Saint Petersburg